Haliotis australis, common name the "queen pāua," yellow-foot pāua, or austral abalone, is a species of edible sea snail, a marine gastropod mollusk in the family Haliotidae, the abalones.

Description
The size of the shell varies between 40 mm and 100 mm. "The thin, oval shell is quite convex. The distance of the apex from margin measures one-eighth to one-ninth the length of the shell. The sculpture consists of faint spirals and a close strong radiating corrugation. The 6 to 8 perforations are circular with elevated edges. The outlines are oval. The right margin is a little straighter. The back of the shell is convex, not carinated at the row of holes. The color pattern is light yellowish-brown, red on the spire, or light green flamed with red. The surface has almost obsolete spiral cords, and regular, close, radiating folds. Between the row of holes and the columellar margin there are no radiating folds, but several (generally three) strong spiral ribs. The spire is a little elevated and contains three whorls .Inside it is  corrugated like the exterior, silvery with blue, green and red reflections, the latter predominating. The columellar plate is narrow.

The corrugated exterior is quite constant and characteristic. Young specimens are more strongly ribbed spirally, and often have radiating stripes of red on a delicate green ground."

Distribution
It is endemic and found across New Zealand.

Human use 

Haliotis australis (also known as 'Queenies') and other two Haliotis species are known as "paua" in New Zealand and are used as a food source. While generally smaller than their Haliotis iris counterparts, they are still harvested but must be a minimum length of 80mm.

References 

 Geiger D.L. & Poppe G.T. (2000). A Conchological Iconography: The family Haliotidae. Conchbooks, Hackenheim Germany. 135pp 83pls.
 Geiger D.L. & Owen B. (2012) Abalone: Worldwide Haliotidae. Hackenheim: Conchbooks. viii + 361 pp. page(s): 72

External links 
 photos
 

australis
Gastropods of New Zealand
Gastropods described in 1791
Taxa named by Johann Friedrich Gmelin